is a 1992 video game released by Irem under license from Hudson Soft for arcades. It is part of the Bomberman series. It was the second Bomberman game to be released for arcades, preceded by Bomberman (1991), which was also released by Irem.

This game is called New Atomic Punk - Global Quest or Atomic Punk 2 in North America, and New DynaBlaster - Global Quest in Europe. The North American version is called Atomic Punk 2, but it shows the text New Atomic Punk - Global Quest in-game.

Gameplay 

When all enemies are destroyed the player automatically goes to the next stage. Items are lost after each stage, reducing the inventory to one bomb, and the default blast radius and walking speed. There are six worlds with six levels in each; after every fifth level there is a Bonus Stage, wherein soft blocks contain many points items and power ups.

Development and release

Reception 

In Japan, Game Machine listed Bomber Man World on their July 15, 1992 issue as being the tenth most-successful table arcade unit of the month, outperforming titles such as King of the Monsters 2 and Football Frenzy. In North America, RePlay reported in the game to be the eighth most-popular arcade game of the month in October 1992. Play Meter also listed the title to be the forty-sixth most-popular arcade game at the time.

The game received positive reviews from critics. Gary Harrod of British magazine Sinclair User praised the visuals and gameplay, stating that "this may be a simple formula game but it's still good fun to play". Andreas Knauf of German magazine Video Games gave the title a positive outlook. GamesMaster gave it a mixed outlook.

Notes

References

External links 

Bomberman World on Arcade-History.com
Information about Bomberman World

1992 video games
Arcade video games
Arcade-only video games
Irem games
World
Multiplayer and single-player video games
Video games developed in Japan